Räyskälä Airfield is an airfield in Räyskälä, Loppi, Finland, about  west of Loppi centre and  east of Forssa town centre. It is the largest sports aviation centre in the Nordic countries, and one of the busiest general aviation airfields in Finland. It is also home to the Finnish Sports Aviation Academy.

Räyskälä Airfield hosted the World Gliding Championships in 1976 and 2014, the Junior World Gliding Championships in 2009, and the European Gliding Championships in 1996 and 2005.

See also
List of airports in Finland

References

External links
 
 Räyskälä Airfield
 VFR Suomi/Finland – Räyskälä Airfield
 Lentopaikat.net – Räyskälä Airfield 

Airports in Finland
Loppi
Buildings and structures in Kanta-Häme